Rhinostomus frontalis is a species of weevils, previously placed in a genus called  Yuccaborus and known as the yucca weevils.

References

Further reading

External links
 Texas A&M Extension: Coleoptera-Curculionidae Rhinostomus frontalis - Snout and Bark Beetles (retrieved 10 January 2020)
 Biolib.cz: Rhinostomus frontalis (LeConte, 1874) (retrieved 10 January 2020)
 

Dryophthorinae